Cannabist Kansai is a cannabis advocacy group formed in Japan in 1999. They organize an annual Marijuana March in Osaka.

See also

References

External links
 

1999 establishments in Japan
1999 in cannabis
Cannabis in Japan
Cannabis organizations
Drug policy of Japan
Organizations established in 1999